Saterland (Saterland Frisian:) is a municipality in the district of Cloppenburg, in Lower Saxony, Germany. It is situated between the cities of Leer, Cloppenburg, and Oldenburg. It is home to Saterland Frisians, who speak Frisian in addition to German.

The municipality of Saterland was formed in 1974, when the smaller municipalities Strücklingen (Strukelje in Saterland Frisian), Ramsloh (Roomelse), Sedelsberg (Seeidelsbierich) and Scharrel (Schäddel) were merged.

History 
In medieval times, the Saterland was a sandy region occupying an area of about 15 km long by 1–4 km wide surrounded by marshes.  It was settled between the 10th and 13th centuries by Frisians from East Frisia.  Being relatively isolated, the inhabitants developed their own form of the East Frisian language, Saterland Frisian, which survives to this day.  The "Saterfriesen," as the speakers of this language are called in German, are the smallest minority recognized by the federal government.

Notable places 
On the area of the municipality of Saterland is the VLF transmitter DHO38, a large VLF transmitter of the German Navy for sending commands to submarines.

References

External links 
 
 Official site 
 Official site 

Cloppenburg (district)